Freak Out! My Life with Frank Zappa is a 2011 book by British author Pauline Butcher, which is an account of the four years (1967–1971) she worked as the secretary to rock and roll musician Frank Zappa.

Butcher was a 21-year-old secretary whose firm sent her to type up the lyrics from Zappa’s second album, ‘Absolutely Free’, for the London free newspaper, International Times.  After arriving in California, Butcher first helped Zappa work on a book on politics, helped manage a group of female musicians Zappa founded, and managed the correspondence with his fans.

When, in 2008, Butcher began to write her memoir, she used as source material the detailed letters to her mother who had kept them in a shoe-box for 40 years. Her mother had stored a box full of letters Butcher wrote from California.

Reviewers asserted that Butcher brought a different perspective to the study of Zappa's work than other members of Zappa's entourage. A review in Critics at large described Butcher as a "a cultured and fashionable secretary out of Swinging London," and characterized her book as "a reverse of Pygmalion".  Jim Caligiuri, writing in the Austin Chronicle, concluded his review with "Offering deeply personal glimpses of Zappa, Butcher's coming-of-age story is so captivating and vividly told that many will be surprised to discover it's her first book."

According to Deborah Orr of The Guardian, the book "captures a particularly intense experience of a very brief, yet enormously influential, period in the evolution of western womanhood ... the interstitial time between sexual liberation and women's liberation".

The Telegraph published an excerpt from the book.

During an interview, in 2012, Butcher described taking the advice of a writing mentor, at the BBC, who had told her to "write something that no one else could write.". She had worked to develop a script for a series based on her time with Zappa, only to learn that the BBC had approved a documentary on Zappa, to be hosted by Germaine Greer.  When she was advised the BBC would not fund two Zappa projects, she decided to use her research in a book.

In 2014 BBC Radio adapted the book into a radio drama.

References

2011 non-fiction books
British memoirs
Frank Zappa
Books about rock musicians